Nausibius major is a species of silvanid flat bark beetle in the family Silvanidae. It is found in Central America and North America.

References

Further reading

External links

 

Silvanidae
Articles created by Qbugbot
Beetles described in 1869